Old Congregational Church can refer to:

 Old Congregational Church (Sycamore, Illinois)
 Old Congregational Church (Rhode Island)